"Today I Started Loving You Again" is a 1968 song written by Merle Haggard and Bonnie Owens. Haggard first recorded it as a B-side to his number 1 hit, "The Legend of Bonnie and Clyde", but it failed to chart. It also appears on his 1968 album, The Legend of Bonnie & Clyde. The song was later recorded by Al Martino in 1969, followed by many other artists, including Waylon Jennings 1968, Conway Twitty 1968, Martina McBride 2005, Gene Summers 1980, Charlie McCoy 1972, David Peters, Jerry Lee Lewis 1968, Kenny Rogers and the First Edition 1972, Bettye Swann 1969, Connie Smith 1969, Barbara Mandrell 1974, Sammi Smith 1975, Bobby Bland 1975, Emmylou Harris 1986, Skeeter Davis 1970 and Dolly Parton 1996. More recently it was recorded by Jeff Carson and Merle Haggard for Carson's 1997 album, Butterfly Kisses.

Chart peaks

Al Martino

Charlie McCoy

David Peters

Kenny Rogers and the First Edition

Bettye Swann

Sammi Smith

Bobby Bland

Emmylou Harris

References

Merle Haggard songs
Al Martino songs
Charlie McCoy songs
Kenny Rogers and The First Edition songs
Sammi Smith songs
Bobby Bland songs
Emmylou Harris songs
Gene Summers songs
1968 songs
Songs written by Merle Haggard
Songs written by Bonnie Owens